

Events

Television
5 January - SBS ceases VHF transmissions on Channel 0 in Sydney and Melbourne.
20 January - Neighbours makes its debut on Network Ten and comes to dominate the 7:00pm weeknight timeslot.
25 January - American sitcom starring Soleil Moon Frye and George Gaynes Punky Brewster receives its Australian television debut on Seven Network.
28 January - Australian news and current affairs program The 7.30 Report debuts on ABC.
30 January - Debut of Australian soap opera Prime Time on Nine Network. It was the very last soap opera from Australia ever produced with exterior location scenes shot on film and interior scenes shot on videotape.
10 February - Australian soap opera Return to Eden premieres on Network Ten.
13 March - Australia's popular and influential TV sketch comedy The D-Generation which was created and written by a group of students from Melbourne University who had gained local notoriety for their stage work such as Marg Downey, Michael Veitch and Tom Gleisner debuts on ABC.
16 March - SBS expands into Perth and Hobart.
31 March - ABC airs extra morning programs for children for the first time due to school term breaks from 10:00am to 12:00pm.
7 July - Last and final episode of the Australian soap opera Return to Eden airs on Network Ten.
23 July - The Royal Wedding of Prince Andrew and Sarah Ferguson is broadcast on all television stations except for SBS.
5 August - British police procedural television series The Bill premieres on ABC.
19 September - Nine Network celebrates 30 years of television with a two-hour special featuring footage from some of TV's most popular and most remembered programs and personalities.
27 October - Neighbours airs on the BBC in the UK for the first time.
30 October - The Movie Show begins on SBS.
November - Pbl Mini series Cyclone Tracy + The Great Bookie Robbery air on Channel Nine
11 December - Final episode of the Australian soap opera Prisoner airs on Network Ten.
15 December - ABC airs extra morning programs for children during the Summer Holidays from 10:00am to 12:00pm until February where School Term 1 will begin.
December - The Herald and Weekly Times Ltd, owners of HSV-7 & ADS-7 are sold to Rupert Murdoch's News Limited for $1.8 billion. As News Limited owned ATV-10 at this time, HSV-7 is sold to Fairfax (already owners of ATN-7 & BTQ-7) in February 1987 for $320 million.
Australian children's series Mr. Squiggle returns with a brand new series with Roxanne Kimmorley taking over as presenter.
AUSSAT satellites are launched, bringing television to remote areas for the first time.
The 1986 Commonwealth Games are telecast live on ABC from Edinburgh, Scotland.

Debuts
 20 January - Off the Dish (Network Ten)
 28 January - The 7.30 Report (ABC-TV)
 30 January - Prime Time (Nine Network)
 10 February - C'mon Kids (Nine Network)
 10 February - Return to Eden (Network Ten)
 9 March - A Fortunate Life (Nine Network)
 13 March - The D-Generation (ABC-TV)
 20 March - The Girl from Steel City (SBS)
 31 March - Edge of the Wedge (ABC-TV)
 3 April - Game of Life (ABC-TV)
 6 May - The Video Comedy Show (ABC-TV)
 9 May - Saturdee (Channel Seven)
 15 May - Fame and Misfortune (ABC-TV)
 26 May - The Flying Doctors (Nine Network)
 15 June - Don Spencer's Feathers, Furs or Fins (ABC-TV)
 19 July - The Cartoon Company (Nine Network)
 29 July - The Noise (SBS)
 22 September - My Brother Tom (Network Ten)
 28 September/30 September - Whose Baby? (28 September: Channel Seven - Melbourne, 30 September: Channel Seven - Sydney)
 30 September - Studio 86 (ABC-TV)
 30 September - Filmstruck (ABC-TV)
 2 October - The Haunted School (ABC-TV)
 14 October - The Challenge (Nine Network)
 20 October - Sword of Honour (Channel Seven)
 30 October - The Movie Show (SBS)
 10 November - Professor Poopsnagle's Steam Zeppelin (Nine Network)

New International Programming
 2 January -  Malibu (Nine Network)
 4 January -  La Linea (ABC TV)
 4 January - / Amigo and Friends (SBS)
 5 January - / The Mighty Orbots (Channel Seven)
 5 January - / Snorks (Channel Seven - Sydney)
 6 January -  Eye to Eye (Nine Network)
 7 January - / Kennedy (Nine Network)
 8 January -  The Return (SBS)
 11 January - / The Transformers (Network Ten)
 23 January -  The Jockey School (ABC TV)
 25 January -  Punky Brewster (Channel Seven)
 30 January -  The Happy Apple (ABC TV)
 31 January -  Submarine (ABC TV)
 31 January -  Highway to Heaven (Network Ten)
 3 February - // Lucky Luke (ABC TV)
 10 February -  Kane and Abel (Network Ten)
 11 February -  Tales from the Darkside (Network Ten)
 12 February -  Growing Pains (Nine Network)
 12 February -  Who's the Boss? (Nine Network)
 24 February -  Inside China (SBS)
 27 February -  The Twilight Zone (1985) (Nine Network)
 4 March -  A Death in California (Seven Network)
 5 March -  Cold Warrior (ABC TV)
 20 March -  Office Gossip (SBS)
 31 March -  The Bunjee Venture (ABC TV)
 2 April -  The Return of Bunjee (ABC TV)
 2 April -  Stories from Next Door (SBS)
 2 April -  Spooky (ABC TV)
 3 April -  Paddington Goes to School (ABC TV)
 3 April -  Cuckoo Land (ABC TV)
 4 April -  Nobody's Hero (ABC TV)
 4 April -  It's Punky Brewster (Channel Seven)
 6 April -  Turbo Teen (Network Ten)
 12 April - / Star Wars: Ewoks (Network Ten)
 12 April - / Star Wars: Droids (Network Ten)
 12 April -  Robotech (Network Ten)
 15 April -  Moonlighting (Nine Network)
 27 April -  The New Scooby-Doo Mysteries (Channel Seven)
 28 April -  The Challenge of the Machine Men (Channel Seven)
 30 April -  Bits and Bytes (ABC TV)
 3 May -  SuperTed (ABC TV)
 3 May -  Do It (ABC TV)
 5 May -  The Colbys (Nine Network)
 8 May -  Sunday Blues (SBS)
 12 May -  Longing to Fly (SBS)
 23 May -  Smiley's People (ABC TV)
 23 May -  Letty (ABC TV)
 31 May -  Berrenger's (Channel Seven)
 5 June -  Wil Cwac Cwac (ABC TV)
 5 June -  The Bear, the Tiger and the Others (ABC TV)
 10 June -  Edge of Darkness (ABC TV)
 14 June -  Treffpunkt: Deutschland (ABC TV)
 24 June -  'Allo 'Allo (Channel Seven)
 30 June -  Fast Forward (ABC TV)
 10 July -  Vayia's Treasure (SBS)
 15 July -  Floyd on Fish (SBS)
 17 July -  The Secret Diary of Adrian Mole, Aged 13¾ (ABC TV)
 20 July -  Disney's Adventures of the Gummi Bears (Channel Seven)
 24 July -  The Voyage of the Mimi (ABC TV)
 27 July -  The Wuzzles (Channel Seven)
 2 August -  T-Bag (ABC TV)
 3 August -  The Beiderbecke Affair (ABC TV)
 5 August -  The Bill (ABC TV)
 7 August -  Quaq Quao (ABC TV)
 10 August -  Me and My Girl (Channel Seven)
 11 August -  Yes Prime Minister (ABC TV)
 12 August -  Terry and the Gunrunners (ABC TV)
 13 August -  The Morca Mystery (SBS)
 13 August -  Fiery Skies (SBS)
 13 August -  Doubletake (Network Ten)
 13 August -  The Haunting of Cassie Palmer (ABC TV)
 16 August - / The Irish R.M. (ABC TV)
 17 August - / Spearfield's Daughter (Channel Seven)
 21 August -  Victoria Wood as Seen on TV (ABC TV)
 23 August - // M.A.S.K. (Nine Network)
 24 August -  The Centurions (Network Ten)
 26 August -  Street Hawk (Network Ten)
 6 September - / ThunderCats (Channel Seven)
 11 September -  Anna of the Five Towns (ABC TV)
 11 September -  The Comic Strip Presents... (ABC TV)
 14 September -  Mansfield Park (ABC TV)
 17 September -  Finnegan Begin Again (Channel Seven)
 18 September -  Spenser: For Hire (Nine Network)
 19 September -  Stookie (ABC TV)
 22 September -  Going Bananas (ABC TV)
 23 September -  The Croc-Note Show (ABC TV)
 25 September -  I Had Three Wives (Nine Network)
 29 September -  Small Wonder (Nine Network)
 30 September -  Chessgame (Nine Network)
 6 October -  All at No 20 (ABC TV)
 15 October -  The Last Precinct (Network Ten)
 26 October -  Galtar and the Golden Lance (Channel Seven)
 27 October -  On Wings of Eagles (Network Ten)
 4 November -  Lady Blue (Channel Seven)
 7 November -  Airwolf (Channel Seven)
 10 November -  227 (Network Ten)
 10 November -  Call to Glory (Network Ten)
 10 November -  The Magical World of Gigi (Network Ten)
 11 November -  The Best Times (Channel Seven)
 11 November -  Foley Square (Nine Network)
 11 November -  Mary (Nine Network)
 11 November -  Lime Street (Channel Seven)
 12 November -  Our Family Honor (Channel Seven)
 12 November -  Detective in the House (Channel Seven)
 13 November -  Call to Glory (Network Ten)
 14 November -  Riptide (Network Ten)
 17 November -  Relative Strangers (ABC TV)
 23 November -  Jem (Network Ten)
 25 November -  MacGruder and Loud (Nine Network)
 27 November -  Hawaiian Heat (Nine Network)
 12 December -  Aspel and Co. (ABC TV)
 15 December -  Roland Rat (ABC TV)
 15 December -  Country GP (ABC TV)
 15 December -  Let's Read with Basil Brush (ABC TV)
 18 December -  You Again? (Network Ten)
 21 December -  Freud (ABC TV)
 21 December -  He-Man & She-Ra: A Christmas Special (Channel Seven)
 22 December - // The Care Bears (Network Ten)
 28 December -  The Flintstones' 25th Anniversary Celebration (Channel Seven)
 29 December -  The Hot Shoe Show (ABC TV)
 29 December -  Television Parts (ABC TV)
 31 December -  An Audience with Billy Connolly (ABC TV)

Changes to network affiliation
This is a list of programs which made their premiere on an Australian television network that had previously premiered on another Australian television network. The networks involved in the switch of allegiances are predominantly both free-to-air networks or both subscription television networks. Programs that have their free-to-air/subscription television premiere, after previously premiering on the opposite platform (free-to air to subscription/subscription to free-to air) are not included. In some cases, programs may still air on the original television network. This occurs predominantly with programs shared between subscription television networks.

Domestic

Television shows

1950s
 Mr. Squiggle and Friends (1959 – 1999)

1960s
 Four Corners (1961 – present)

1970s
 Hey Hey It's Saturday (1971 – 1999, 2009 – 2010)
 Young Talent Time (1971 – 1989)
 Countdown (1974 – 1987)
 60 Minutes (1979 – present)
 Prisoner (1979 – 1986)

1980s
 Sale of the Century (1980 – 2001)
 Wheel of Fortune (1981 – 2008)
 Sunday (1981 – 2008)
 Today (1982 – present)
 Perfect Match (1984 – 1989)
 Neighbours (1985 – present)
 The Flying Doctors (1986 – 1993)

Ending this year

Returning this year

TV movies

See also
 1986 in Australia
 List of Australian films of 1986

References